Reidar Haave Olsen (7 November 1923 – 19 February 1944) was a Norwegian pilot who was killed during World War II.

He was born in Hommedal, but settled in Eide. During World War II, he took a pilot's education in Canada, before enlisting in the Norwegian Army Air Service-in-exile in England. He was recorded with 101 flights through hostile area, and was credited with shooting down four enemy aircraft. He died in an aircraft accident near Epping, England, in February 1944. He was decorated with the St. Olav's Medal With Oak Branch.

References

1923 births
1944 deaths
Norwegian Army Air Service personnel of World War II
Norwegian World War II pilots
Norwegian military personnel killed in World War II
Norwegian expatriates in Canada
Norwegian expatriates in England
Aviators killed in aviation accidents or incidents in England
Recipients of the St. Olav's Medal with Oak Branch
People from Grimstad